Hydrophis peronii, commonly known as the horned sea snake, Peron's sea snake, and the spiny-headed seasnake, is a species of venomous snake in the subfamily Hydrophiinae of the family Elapidae. The species is endemic to the western tropical Pacific Ocean. It is the only sea snake with spines on the head.  It is sometimes placed in its own genus Acalyptophis.

Etymology
The specific name, peronii, is in honor of François Péron, a French naturalist and explorer.

Description
The spiny-headed seasnake is a medium-size snake, with the diameter of the neck only one third to two fifths the diameter of the thickest part of the body. The head is small and the tail flattened laterally. The supraoculars are raised, and their free borders are pointed. Dorsally, it is grayish, pale olive, or tan, with dark crossbands, which are narrower than the spaces between them and taper to a point on the sides of the belly. Ventrally, it is uniform whitish or with a series of dark crossbars alternating with spots.

Geographic range
H. peronii is found in the Gulf of Siam, Thailand, Vietnam, the South China Sea, the coast of Guangdong and Strait of Taiwan,
the Philippines, Indonesia, New Guinea, New Caledonia, the Coral Sea Islands, Papua New Guinea,  and Australia, (Northern Territory, Queensland, Western Australia, & possibly New South Wales).

Habitat
The preferred habitats of H. peronii are seas with sandy beds and coral reefs.

Diet
The diet of H. peronii includes small fish.

Reproduction
H. peronii is a viviparous species that produces up to 10 live young per female.

References

Further reading
Bauer AM, Sadlier RA (Editors) (2000). The herpetofauna of New Caledonia. Contributions to Herpetology, 17. Ithaca, New York: Society for Study Amphibians and Reptiles.
Bauer AM, Vindum JV (1990). "A checklist and key to the herpetofauna of New Caledonia, with remarks on biogeography". Proc. California Acad. Sci. 47 (2): 17-45.
Cogger HG (2000). Reptiles and Amphibians of Australia, Sixth Edition. Sanibel Island, Florida: Ralph Curtis Publishing. 808 pp. .
Cox, Merel J.; Van Dijk, Peter Paul; Nabhitabhata, Jaruji; Thirakhupt, Kumthorn (1998). A Photographic Guide to Snakes and other Reptiles of Peninsular Malaysia, Singapore and Thailand. Sanibel Island, Florida: Ralph Curtis Publishing. 144 pp. .
Duméril A-M-C, Bibron G, Duméril A[-H-A] (1854). Erpétologie générale ou histoire naturelle complète des reptiles. Tome septième [Volume 7]. Deuxième partie, comprenant l'histoire des serpents venimeux. Paris: Librairie Encyclopédique de Roret. xii + pp. 781–1536. ("Acalyptus superciliosus vel Peroni ", p. 1340). (in French).
Duméril [AMC] (1853). "Prodrome de la classification des reptiles ophidiens". Mém. Acad. Sci., Paris 23: 399-536. ("Acalyptus Peronii ", new species, p. 522). (in French).
Fischer JG (1856). "Die Familie der Seeschlangen". Abhandl. Nat. Ver. Hamburg 3: 1-78. (in German).
Murphy JC, Cox MJ, Voris HK (1999). "A key to the sea snakes in the gulf of Thailand". Nat. Hist. Bull. Siam Soc. 47: 95-108.
Smith MA (1926). Monograph of the sea-snakes (Hydrophiidae). London: British Museum (Natural History). 130 pp.
Storr GM, Smith LA, Johnstone RE (2002). Snakes of Western Australia. Perth, Western Australia: Western Australian Museum. p. 309.
Taylor EH (1965). "The serpents of Thailand and adjacent waters". Univ. Kansas Sci. Bull. 45 (9): 609-1096.
Zhao E, Adler K (1993). Herpetology of China. Oxford, Ohio: Society for the Study of Amphibians and Reptiles (SSAR). 522 pp.

peronii
Snakes of Australia
Reptiles of Cambodia
Reptiles of China
Reptiles of Indonesia
Reptiles of Malaysia
Snakes of New Caledonia
Reptiles of Papua New Guinea
Reptiles of the Philippines
Reptiles of Taiwan
Reptiles of Thailand
Reptiles of Singapore
Reptiles of Vietnam
Snakes of Southeast Asia
Taxa named by André Marie Constant Duméril
Snakes of China
Snakes of Vietnam
Snakes of Asia
Snakes of New Guinea